Grigoris Tsinos (born 15 December 1958) is a retired Greek football midfielder and later manager.

References

1958 births
Living people
Greek footballers
Roda JC Kerkrade players
Panathinaikos F.C. players
OFI Crete F.C. players
Ethnikos Piraeus F.C. players
Super League Greece players
Association football defenders
Greek expatriate footballers
Expatriate footballers in the Netherlands
Greek expatriate sportspeople in the Netherlands
Greek football managers
Agrotikos Asteras F.C. managers
Kozani F.C. managers
Footballers from Thessaloniki